S. Narayana Swamy alias S. N. Swamy is a screenwriter and actor who works in the Indian film industry predominantly in the Malayalam cinema. Having born in Kochi, Kerala Swamy is particularly known for scripting films in the thriller genre. He has frequently collaborated with directors K. Madhu, Joshiy and A. K. Sajan.

Career
Swamy is the creator of some of the well-known fictional characters in Malayalam cinema including Sethurama Iyer (portrayed by Mammootty) and Sagar Alias Jacky (portrayed by Mohanlal). Sagar Alias Jacky, a notorious gold smuggler, was the protagonist in Irupatham Noottandu (1987) and the eponymous Sagar alias Jacky Reloaded (2009), its spiritual successor. Sethurama Iyer, a CBI officer and the protagonist of the CBI film series, was inspired by a real-life police officer called Radhavinod Raju who retired as Chief of India's National Investigative Agency. The film had five sequels. The character Inspector Balram played by Mammootty in the films Avanazhi(1986) & sequel Balram vs. Tharadas(2006) and Ali Imran, a cop played by Mohanlal in Moonnam Mura (1988) are some of his other creations.

Filmography

Awards and nominations

References

External links
 

Living people
Indian male screenwriters
Malayalam screenwriters
Year of birth missing (living people)
Male actors in Malayalam cinema
Screenwriters from Kochi
20th-century Indian dramatists and playwrights
21st-century Indian dramatists and playwrights
20th-century Indian male writers
21st-century Indian male writers